The Masked Monkey is Volume 51 in the original The Hardy Boys Mystery Stories published by Grosset & Dunlap.

This book was written for the Stratemeyer Syndicate by Vincent Buranelli in 1972.

Plot summary  
The Hardy brothers' search for the missing son of a wealthy industrialist leads them to Brazil and great danger. Chet's hobby at the time was retrieving golf balls from the bottom of ponds at the golf courses around the Bayport area. Chet's hobby brings important clues that help the Hardys round up a gang of criminals who help other criminals change their identity.

Characters

Joe Hardy, Frank Hardy, Fenton Hardy, Laura Hardy, Aunt Gertrude, Chester Morton, J.G Retson, Phil, Tony, Joachim San Marten, Gus McCormick, Mr Jackson, Mrs Martha Jackson, Harris, Harry Grimsel, Sam Radley, Belkin, Moreno.

Setting

Granite city, Bayport, New York, Belem, Manaus

References 

The Hardy Boys books
1972 American novels
1972 children's books
Novels set in Brazil
Grosset & Dunlap books